Jonathan Lee Miller (born 15 November 1972) is an English film, television and theatre actor. He achieved early success for his portrayal of Simon "Sick Boy" Williamson in the dark comedy-drama film Trainspotting (1996) and as Dade Murphy in Hackers (1995) before earning further critical recognition for his performances in Afterglow (1997), Mansfield Park (1999), The Flying Scotsman (2006), Endgame (2009) and T2 Trainspotting (2017); for The Flying Scotsman he received a London Film Critics' Circle nomination for Actor of the Year. He was also part of the principal cast in the films Melinda and Melinda (2004), Dark Shadows (2012) and Byzantium (2013). He has appeared in several theatrical productions, most notably After Miss Julie and Frankenstein, the latter of which earned him an Olivier Award for Best Actor.

Miller starred as the title character in the ABC comedy drama Eli Stone, for which he received a Satellite Award nomination for Best Actor. This was followed by another starring role in the BBC costume drama Emma and a supporting role as Jordan Chase in the fifth season of the Showtime drama Dexter. From 2012 to 2019 he starred as a modern-day version of Sherlock Holmes in the CBS crime drama Elementary, which earned him his second Satellite Award nomination for Best Actor. In 2022, he played British prime minister John Major in the fifth season of the Netflix historical drama The Crown.

Early life
Miller was born on 15 November 1972 in Kingston-upon-Thames and was raised in south west London. The son of Anna (Lee) and Alan Miller, he was inspired by his parents to go into acting. Both were theatre actors. His grandfather was actor Bernard Lee, who played M in the first eleven James Bond films.

Miller attended Tiffin School as a child. He appeared in several school plays such as The Ragged Child and performed as part of the Tiffin Swing Band. He joined the National Youth Music Theatre, where he met fellow actor Jude Law. He left school, aged 16 after taking his GCSEs, to pursue an acting career.

Career

Television
Miller made his television debut with an uncredited appearance in the BBC series Doctor Who at the age of nine in the 1982 episode Kinda. The following year he appeared in Jemima Shore and had a role as Charles Price in the serial drama Mansfield Park. In 1991, he costarred, with Alexei Sayle in "'Itch", which was broadcast on Channel 4 as part of the 4 Play strand, a platform for a series of one-off plays that ran from 1989 to 1991. The play was written by Alexei Sayle and David Stafford. Miller played "Dennis Turnbull", the teenaged son of Gordon and Susan Turnbull. He then appeared in various television shows throughout the 1990s. These included Keeping Up Appearances in 1990, followed by Inspector Morse and Minder in 1991. He appeared in two separate guest roles in the ITV police drama The Bill, one in 1991 and another in 1993, as well as single-episode roles in the BBC drama Between the Lines and the medical drama Casualty, both of which were broadcast in 1992.

In 1993's third instalment of Prime Suspect, Miller played a young man victimised as a child by a paedophile. His first notable acting role that year was in the soap opera EastEnders, wherein he played Jonathan Hewitt. Miller later revealed he had been offered a contract to remain on the show but declined: "It was five weeks' work and I made more money there than I ever had in my life. Then they offered me a year's contract. I said no, thank God. I thought I should get out of there while I still could."

In 2003, Miller appeared in the BBC modernisation of The Canterbury Tales in the episode The Pardoner's Tale and had a starring role as Lord Byron in the television film Byron. He then starred alongside Ray Liotta in the CBS drama Smith. However, the show was canceled after only seven episodes. Miller was then cast as the eponymous character in the legal comedy drama Eli Stone. The show ran for two seasons on ABC and he received a Satellite Award nomination for Best Actor. He then co-starred with Romola Garai in the 2009 BBC costume drama Emma as George Knightley.

Miller appeared in a guest role as Jordan Chase in the fifth season of the Showtime drama Dexter, for which he received a nomination for Screen Actors Guild Award for being part of the main cast in the category of Outstanding Performance by an Ensemble in a Drama Series. In early 2010, it was reported he was set to portray Rick Grimes in the television adaptation of the comic The Walking Dead. It was later revealed that Andrew Lincoln had been cast. In 2011, Miller auditioned for the role of Sherlock Holmes in the CBS adaption based on the works of Arthur Conan Doyle. He originally turned down the part, as he feared it would be too similar to the BBC version Sherlock. However, after receiving the script he accepted the part, and it was officially announced he would star in Elementary, alongside Lucy Liu. This earned him his second Satellite Award nomination for Best Actor.

In 2021, it was announced that he was to star in season five of The Crown, as former British Prime Minister, John Major.

Film
He first starred in the film Hackers (1995), with Angelina Jolie, whom he married in 1996. Shortly after Hackers, Miller was cast as Sick Boy in Trainspotting. He was suggested for the role by Ewan McGregor. The accent he used in the film was regarded as convincing, leading some people to incorrectly believe that he was Scottish. Miller has stated: "I had to do a lot of work. I read and re-read the book and I pretended to be Scottish all the time I was in Glasgow, hanging around with Scots, picking up bits and pieces on the street and in bars. Everyone's been very encouraging and Danny [Boyle, the director] thinks that I've got it about right. Of course, the others are from all over Scotland and have different accents themselves, so I've tried to just pick up a general, composite accent."

In 1997, he played Billy Prior in the film adaptation of Pat Barker's World War I novel Regeneration. In 2000, he played Cameron Colley in Complicity, based on the book by Iain Banks. He costarred in the film Love, Honour and Obey as Johnny, a London street kid getting mixed up with a notorious British gangster. Also in 2000, he appeared as Simon Sheppard in Wes Craven's Dracula 2000. In 2006 Miller portrayed cyclist Graeme Obree in The Flying Scotsman.

He was considered as the third teammate to join Ben Fogle and James Cracknell in Team QinetiQ for the Amundsen Omega 3 South Pole Race in January 2009. He participated in training for the event in Norway, which was televised for a BBC2 documentary series On Thin Ice. He was not able to attend the race because of filming commitments, after Eli Stone was extended for a second season.

In 1997, he was involved with the creation and operation of the production company Natural Nylon with friend Jude Law. Natural Nylon folded in 2003.

Theatre
In November 1999, he played Brito in Paul Corcoran's Four Nights in Knaresborough at the Tricycle Theatre, London. In March 2011, at the Royal National Theatre, he played both Victor Frankenstein and Frankenstein's Monster on alternate nights, opposite Benedict Cumberbatch, in a stage adaptation of Frankenstein. Directed by Danny Boyle, the play was broadcast to cinemas worldwide as part of National Theatre Live on 17 March 2011 and additional dates throughout March and April. He also appeared on Broadway in a production of After Miss Julie, with his performance receiving very positive reviews. In March 2004, he played Christian in Festen by David Eldridge at The Almeida Theatre in London.

Awards and honours
 Laurence Olivier Award (2012)
 Satellite Award (2008, 2012)
 IQ Award (2014)

Initially Edward Snowden had been nominated by Mensa members, and the IQ commission had approved his nomination; but the managing board of Mensa revoked Snowden's nomination because "Mensa is not allowed to comment on political issues." In protest, Miller was then proposed by one member, for his portrayal of Sherlock Holmes. He won the most votes to take the award.

Personal life
Miller married actress Angelina Jolie on 28 March 1996. They separated 18 months later, and were divorced in 2000; however, they remain close friends. He began dating actress and model Michele Hicks in 2006. They married in July 2008 in Malibu, California. The couple have one son, Buster Timothy Miller, born in December 2008. They divorced in 2018.

He is a marathon runner, often supporting the charity Mencap. Miller was signed up to run the 2006 Marathon des Sables but had to drop out due to shooting a film. He ran the 2008 London Marathon in 3:01:40. Miller is an advocate to finding treatment for the disease Sanfilippo syndrome, following a case with five-year-old Jonah Weishaar. In 2014, he addressed the Congressional caucus in Washington, D.C., on behalf of rare disease organisations, in the hope of securing funding for treatment research.

In November 2014, he became an American citizen.

Muay Thai

Miller has trained in both Muay Thai and Brazilian Jiu-Jitsu at Evolution Muay Thai in New York City. In May 2018, he took part in an exhibition Muay Thai bout held at Chok Sabai Gym in New York City, which followed a five-week training camp leading up to the event.

On 1 February 2019, Miller made his Muay Thai debut at "Friday Night Fights" held at Broad Street Ballroom in New York City, where he took on Robert Bermudez in the scheduled-for-three-rounds 145-pound bout. Miller won the fight by knockout in the third round with a right cross – left hook combination.

Filmography

Film

Television

Stage

Awards and nominations

Kickboxing record

Legend:

See also

 List of actors who have played Sherlock Holmes
 List of British actors
 List of people from Kingston upon Thames

References

External links

 
 
 

1972 births
20th-century English male actors
21st-century English male actors
Male actors from London
English expatriates in the United States
English male film actors
English male soap opera actors
English male stage actors
English male child actors
Laurence Olivier Award winners
British expatriate male actors in the United States
Living people
People educated at Tiffin School
People from Kingston upon Thames